Operating System/Virtual Storage 1, or OS/VS1, is a discontinued IBM mainframe computer operating system designed to be run on IBM System/370 hardware. It was the successor to the Multiprogramming with a Fixed number of Tasks (MFT) option of System/360's operating system OS/360. OS/VS1, in comparison to its predecessor, supported virtual memory (then called virtual storage). OS/VS1 was generally available during the 1970s and 1980s, and it is no longer supported by IBM.

Description
OS/VS1 was OS/360 MFT II with a single virtual address space;  by comparison, OS/VS2 SVS was OS/360 MVT with a single virtual address space. OS/VS1 was often installed on mid-range IBM mainframe systems, such as the System/370 Model 145 and, later, the System/370 Model 148.

OS/VS1 was intended to manage a medium-sized work load (for the 1970s) consisting only of batch processing applications, running within a fixed number of operating system partitions via the batch job management system Job Entry Subsystem 1 (JES1). This was in contrast to OS/VS2 which was intended to handle larger work loads consisting of batch applications, online interactive users (using the Time Sharing Option, or TSO), or a combination of both.  However, OS/VS1 could, and often did, support interactive applications and users by running IBM's CICS transaction processing monitor as a job within one of its partitions.

Installation and modification of OS/VS1 was accomplished via IBM's cumbersome System Generation (SYSGEN) process.

Remote Entry Services (RES)
OS/VS1 included a replacement for OS/360 RJE. It allowed submission and retrieval of jobs by 2770, 2780 and 3780 terminals and by workstation programs included with OS/VS1 for, e.g., 1130. RES included Remote Terminal Access Method and a closer integration with Job Management than what RJE had.

IBM upgrades
OS/VS1 went through seven product releases. IBM enhanced OS/VS1 Release 7 with four releases of the IBM OS/VS1 Basic Programming Extensions (BPE), product 5662-257. BPE provides support for new 1980s hardware, such as 3380 Direct Access Storage, and for VM handshaking between VTAM and VM/VTAM Communications Network Application (VCNA).

IBM announced the last BPE release, OS/VS1 Basic Programming Extensions Release 4, on September 15, 1983, with planned general availability in March 1984.

IBM announced the end of functional enhancements to OS/VS1 in 1984. IBM recommended OS/VS1 installations migrate to MVS/370 or MVS/XA. To assist with the migration to MVS/XA, IBM made the VM/XA Migration Aid. It allowed installations to run OS/VS1 and MVS/XA simultaneously on the same machine, as guests of a third systemVM/XA. This way, the new MVS/XA system could be tested while the old production OS/VS1 system was still in use.

On January 24, 1989, IBM announced  the intention to withdraw OS/VS1 and OS/VS1 BPE from marketing effective April 24, 1989, and to discontinue service effective February 28, 1990.

Time-sharing
Although IBM's Time Sharing Option (TSO) required VS2, customers with a 370/145 or 370/148 had other time-sharing options.
One combination was VM/CMS for time sharing, and a guest "machine" running OS/360 MFT II for batch.

Conversational Remote Job Entry
Optional component of OS/360 MFT II, OS/360 MVT and OS/VS1, CRJE allowed the user at a line-mode terminal to edit text datasets, submit jobs and access job output.

TONE for VS1
A non-IBM time-sharing product named TONE (TSO-like, for VS1 / VS ONE) was marketed by Tone Software Co.

References

Further reading
Functional structure of IBM virtual storage operating systems, Part I: Influences of dynamic address translation on operating system technology, by M. A. Auslander and J. F. Jaffe, IBM Systems Journal, Volume 12 (1973), No 4, Page 368
OS/VS1 Concepts and Philosophies, by T. F. Wheeler, Jr., IBM Systems Journal, Volume 13 (1974), No 3, Page 213
The job entry subsystem of OS/VS1, by J. H. Baily, J. A. Howard, and T. J. Szczygielski, IBM Systems Journal, Volume 13 (1974), No 3, Page 253 (The OS/V1 job entry subsystem was named JES1)

IBM mainframe operating systems
1972 software